Burkholderia metallica is a bacterium from the genus of Burkholderia and the family of Burkholderiaceae which belongs to the Burkholderia cepacia complex.

References

External links
Type strain of Burkholderia metallica at BacDive -  the Bacterial Diversity Metadatabase

Burkholderiaceae
Bacteria described in 2008